2003 in sports describes the year's events in world sport.

Alpine skiing
 Alpine Skiing World Cup
 Men's overall season championship: Stephan Eberharter, Austria
 Women's overall season championship: Janica Kostelić, Croatia

American football
 Super Bowl XXXVII – the Tampa Bay Buccaneers (NFC) won 48–21 over the Oakland Raiders (AFC)
Location: San Diego Stadium
Attendance: 67,603
MVP: Dexter Jackson, S (Tampa Bay)
 Fiesta Bowl (2002 season):
 The Ohio State Buckeyes won 31-24 over the Miami Hurricanes (double overtime) to win BCS National Championship
 September 14 – Jamal Lewis sets NFL single game record for rushing yards (295) helping Baltimore Ravens beat Cleveland Browns 33-13.

Artistic gymnastics
 World Artistic Gymnastics Championships –
 Men's all-around champions: Paul Hamm, US, Yang Wei, China
 Women's all-around champion: Svetlana Khorkina, Russia
 Men's team competition champion: China
 Women's team competition champion: US

Association football

 2003 Confederations Cup – host nation France wins a tournament marred by tragedy after Cameroon player Marc-Vivien Foé collapsed and died during a semifinal match.
 UEFA Champions League – AC Milan wins 3-2 on penalties over Juventus, after a 0-0 draw at Old Trafford. This was AC Milan’s 6th European Cup.
 UEFA Cup – FC Porto wins 3-2 in the final against Celtic, after extra time, with a silver goal by Derlei. This is Porto’s first UEFA Cup title.
 European Super Cup – AC Milan beats FC Porto 1-0, winning the cup for the fourth time.
 Intercontinental Cup – Boca Juniors win 3-1 on penalties over AC Milan, after a 1-1 draw at the end of extra time. This is Boca Juniors’ third cup.
 Women's World Cup – Germany wins the final against Sweden 2-1 after extra time.

Athletics

 23–31 August – 2003 World Championships in Athletics held in Paris

Australian rules football
 Australian Football League
 The Brisbane Lions win the 107th AFL premiership by defeating Collingwood 20.14 (134) to 12.12 (84) in the 2003 AFL Grand Final. The Lions’ win gives them the first premiership “hat-trick” since  in 1955, 1956 and 1957.
 Brownlow Medal awarded to Nathan Buckley (Collingwood), Adam Goodes (Sydney Swans) and Mark Ricciuto (Adelaide Crows)
 Leigh Matthews Trophy awarded to Michael Voss (Brisbane Lions)
 West Australian Football League:
 August 10: On a rainswept Arena Joondalup, East Perth score only 0.9 (9) against deadly rivals West Perth. It is the first goalless score in WAFL/WANFL/Westar Rules football since West Perth themselves kicked 0.10 (10) against soon-to-be-defunct Midland Junction in May 1916.

Baseball

 April 4 – Sammy Sosa hits his 500th career home run off Cincinnati Reds pitcher Scott Sullivan in the seventh inning at Great American Ball Park, becoming only the eighteenth player in Major League Baseball history to hit 500 or more home runs, as well as the first Hispanic to do so.
 May 5 – Matt Stairs’ home run off Houston Astros pitcher Wade Miller was estimated at 461 feet, making it the longest home run in the history of Minute Maid Park.
 May 11 – Rafael Palmeiro hit his 500th career home run off Cleveland Indians pitcher David Elder becoming only the 19th player in Major League Baseball history to hit 500 or more home runs.
 June 11 – Houston Astro pitcher Roy Oswalt started a no-hitter against the New York Yankees on June 11. Oswalt left after one inning, and five more Astros continued to no-hit the Yankees. Peter Munro pitched 2? innings, Kirk Saarloos pitched 1? innings, Brad Lidge pitched two innings, Octavio Dotel pitched one inning in which he recorded four strikeouts and Billy Wagner pitched a perfect ninth to close out a six-pitcher no-hitter that resulted in 13 strikeouts and an 8-0 victory over the Yankees.
 June 13 – New York Yankee Roger Clemens becomes the 21st pitcher in history to win 300 games and only the 3rd pitcher to record 4,000 career strikeouts as he defeats the St. Louis Cardinals 5-2.
 July 29 – Bill Mueller becomes the only player in major league history to hit two grand slams in a single game from opposite sides of the plate. He in fact hit three home runs in that game, and the two grand slams were in consecutive at-bats.
 2003 World Series – The Florida Marlins win 4 games to 2 over the New York Yankees.

Basketball

 NBA Finals – The San Antonio Spurs win their second NBA title, defeating the New Jersey Nets 4 games to 2. Tim Duncan, who nearly scores a quadruple-double in the deciding Game 6, is named Finals MVP.
 NCAA Men's Basketball Championship –
 Syracuse Orange win 81-78 over the Kansas Jayhawks
 December 13 – The largest crowd in the sport's history, 78,129, packed Ford Field in Detroit to watch Michigan State and Kentucky. Kentucky wins 79-74.*
 NCAA Women's Basketball Championship –
 UConn Huskies win 73-68 over the Tennessee Lady Vols
 WNBA Finals – Detroit Shock win 2 games to 1 over the Los Angeles Sparks, winning the franchise's first title, and marking the first time an Eastern conference team is WNBA world champions.
 Chinese Basketball Association finals: Bayi Rockets defeat Guangdong Southern Tigers, 3 games to 1.
 National Basketball League (Australia) Finals: Sydney Kings defeated the Perth Wildcats 2-0 in best-of-three final series.

Boxing
 May 9 to May 18 – African Amateur Boxing Championships held in Yaoundé, Cameroon
 July 6 to July 13 – World Amateur Boxing Championships held in Bangkok
 August 8 to August 15 – Pan American Games held in Santo Domingo, Dominican Republic
 September 13 – Shane Mosley conquers the WBA and WBC world Jr. Middleweight titles with a 12-round unanimous decision over Oscar De La Hoya in rematch of their 2000 bout
 October 4 to October 13 – All-Africa Games held in Abuja, Nigeria

Canadian football
 February 27 – Darren Flutie retires
 November 16 – the Edmonton Eskimos win the 91st Grey Cup game, defeating the Montreal Alouettes 34–22 at Mosaic Stadium in Regina.
 November 22 – Université Laval win the Vanier Cup, defeating St. Mary's University 14–7.

Cricket
 The Ashes – Australia defeats England 4-1
 May – West Indies defeats Australia by scoring a world record 418 runs in the fourth innings
 2003 Cricket World Cup – Australia defeats India in the final by 125 runs
 Domestic competitions
 County Championship (England and Wales) – Sussex CCC
 Sheffield Shield (Australia) – New South Wales
 First Twenty20 Cup series held in England and won by Surrey CCC

Curling
 2003 Ford World Curling Championship
 Women's Final: (April 12) United States (Debbie McCormick) 5-3 Canada (Colleen Jones)
 Men's Final: (April 13) Canada (Randy Ferbey) 10-6 Switzerland (Ralph Stöckli)

Cycle racing
Road bicycle racing
 Giro d'Italia won by Gilberto Simoni of Italy
 Tour de France – Lance Armstrong (Rescinded)
 2003 UCI Road World Championships – Men's road race – Igor Astarloa of Spain
Cyclo-cross
 UCI Cyclo-cross World Championships
 men's competition won by Bart Wellens
 women's competition won by Daphny van den Brand

Dogsled racing
 Iditarod Trail Sled Dog Race Champion
 Robert Sørlie wins will lead dog: Tipp

Field hockey
 Men's Champions Trophy: Netherlands
 Women's Champions Trophy: Australia

Figure skating
 World Figure Skating Championships –
 Men's champion: Evgeni Plushenko, Russia
 Ladies’ champion: Michelle Kwan, United States
 Pair skating champions: Shen Xue and Zhao Hongbo, China
 Ice dancing champions: Shae-Lynn Bourne and Victor Kraatz, Canada

Floorball 
 Women's World Floorball Championships
 Champion: Sweden
 Men's under-19 World Floorball Championships
 Champion: Finland
 European Cup
 Men's champion: Haninge IBK
 Women's champion: Balrog IK

Gaelic Athletic Association
 Camogie
 All-Ireland Camogie Champion: Tipperary
 National Camogie League: Cork
 Gaelic football
 All-Ireland Senior Football Championship – Tyrone 0-12 defeated Armagh 0-9
 National Football League – Tyrone 0-21 defeated Laois 1-8
 Ladies' Gaelic football
 All-Ireland Senior Football Champion: Mayo
 National Football League: Laois
 Hurling
 All-Ireland Senior Hurling Championship – Kilkenny 1-14 died Cork 1-11
 National Hurling League – Kilkenny 5–14 beat Tipperary 5–13

Gliding
 World Gliding Championships, Leszno, Poland
 Open Class Winner: Holger Karow, Germany; Glider: Schempp-Hirth Nimbus-4
 18-metre Class Winner: Wolfgang Janowitsch, Austria; Glider: Schempp-Hirth Ventus-2
 15-metre Class Winner: John Coutts, New Zealand; Glider: Alexander Schleicher ASW 27
 Standard Class Winner: Andrew Davis, UK; Glider: Schempp-Hirth Discus 2
 World Gliding Championships, Nitra, Slovakia
 World Class Winner: Sebastian Kawa, Poland; Glider: PZL PW-5

Golf
Men's professional
 Major championship results:
 Masters Tournament – Mike Weir becomes the first Canadian and the first left-handed golfer to win The Masters. He defeats Len Mattiace on the first playoff hole.
 U.S. Open – Jim Furyk. Tournament takes place at Olympia Fields, and Furyk wins his first major by 3 shots.
 British Open – Ben Curtis, an outsider, wins by a single shot from Thomas Björn and Vijay Singh at Royal St. George's.
 PGA Championship – Shaun Micheel, another outside, wins by 2 shots at Oak Hill Country Club.
Men's amateur
 British Amateur – Gary Wolstenholme
 U.S. Amateur – Nick Flanagan
 European Amateur – Brian McElhinney
Women's professional
 Major results:
 Kraft Nabisco Championship – Patricia Meunier-Lebouc
 U.S. Women's Open – Hilary Lunke wins an 18-hole playoff over Angela Stanford and Kelly Robbins.
 LPGA Championship – Annika Sörenstam
 Women's British Open – Annika Sörenstam
 September 12–14 – 2003 Solheim Cup – Team Europe win back the cup from Team United States 17½ to 10½ points.

Handball
 2003 World Men's Handball Championship played in Portugal
 Gold medal: Croatia
 Silver medal: Germany
 Bronze medal: France

Harness racing
 North America Cup – Yankee Cruiser
 United States Pacing Triple Crown races –
 Cane Pace – No Pan Intended
 Little Brown Jug – No Pan Intended
 Messenger Stakes – No Pan Intended
 United States Trotting Triple Crown races –
 Hambletonian – Amigo Hall
 Yonkers Trot – Sugar Trader
 Kentucky Futurity – Mr. Muscleman
 Australian Inter Dominion Harness Racing Championship –
 Pacers: Baltic Eagle
 Trotters: Take A Moment

Horse racing
Steeplechases
 Cheltenham Gold Cup – Best Mate
 Grand National – Monty's Pass
Hurdle races
 Champion Hurdle – Rooster Booster
Flat races
 Australia – Melbourne Cup won by Makybe Diva
 Canadian Triple Crown Races:
 Queen's Plate won by Wando
 Prince of Wales Stakes won by Wando
 Breeders' Stakes won by Wando
 Wando becomes the seventh horse to win the Canadian Triple Crown.
 Dubai – Dubai World Cup won by Moon Ballad	
 France – Prix de l'Arc de Triomphe won by Dalakhani
 Ireland – Irish Derby Stakes won by Alamshar
 Japan – Japan Cup won by Tap Dance City
 English Triple Crown Races:
 2,000 Guineas Stakes – Refuse To Bend
 The Derby – Kris Kin
 St. Leger Stakes – Brian Boru
 United States Triple Crown Races:
 Kentucky Derby won by Funny Cide
 Preakness Stakes won by Funny Cide
 Belmont Stakes won by Empire Maker
 Breeders' Cup World Thoroughbred Championships:
 Breeders' Cup Classic – Pleasantly Perfect
 Breeders’ Cup Distaff – Adoration
 Breeders' Cup Filly & Mare Turf – Islington
 Breeders' Cup Juvenile – Action This Day
 Breeders' Cup Juvenile Fillies – Halfbridled
 Breeders' Cup Mile – Six Perfections
 Breeders' Cup Sprint – Cajun Beat
 Breeders' Cup Turf – High Chaparral and Johar dead-heated

Ice hockey
 Art Ross Trophy as the NHL’s leading scorer during the regular season: Peter Forsberg, Colorado Avalanche.
 Hart Memorial Trophy for the NHL’s Most Valuable Player: Peter Forsberg, Colorado Avalanche.
 Stanley Cup – New Jersey Devils win 4 games to 3 over the Mighty Ducks of Anaheim. The Conn Smythe Trophy as the playoffs MVP is won by Jean-Sébastien Giguère of Anaheim.
 World Hockey Championship
 Men’s champion: Canada defeats Sweden 3-2.
 Junior Men’s champion: Russia win 3-2 over Canada.
 Women’s champion: tournament scheduled for Beijing, China cancelled due to the outbreak of SARS.
 2003 Memorial Cup
 Final: Kitchener Rangers 6-3 Hull Olympiques.

Lacrosse
 Victoria Shamrocks win the Mann Cup.
 St. Catharines Athletics win the Minto Cup
 In May, Canada wins the first World Indoor Lacrosse Championship, defeating the Iroquois Nation in the final by a score of 21-4.
 The Toronto Rock win the Champion's Cup over the Rochester Knighthawks.
 The Long Island Lizards win the Steinfeld Cup over the Baltimore Bayhawks.
 Amherst College Women’s Lacrosse team defeats Middlebury College to win the Division III National Championship, 11-9.

Mixed martial arts
The following is a list of major noteworthy MMA events during 2003 in chronological order.

|-
|align=center style="border-style: none none solid solid; background: #e3e3e3"|Date
|align=center style="border-style: none none solid solid; background: #e3e3e3"|Event
|align=center style="border-style: none none solid solid; background: #e3e3e3"|Alternate Name/s
|align=center style="border-style: none none solid solid; background: #e3e3e3"|Location
|align=center style="border-style: none none solid solid; background: #e3e3e3"|Attendance
|align=center style="border-style: none none solid solid; background: #e3e3e3"|PPV Buyrate
|align=center style="border-style: none none solid solid; background: #e3e3e3"|Notes
|-align=center
|February 28
|UFC 41: Onslaught
|
| Atlantic City, New Jersey, US
|13,401
|60,000
|
|-align=center
|March 16
|Pride 25: Body Blow
|
| Yokohama, Japan
|
|
|
|-align=center
|March 27
|WEC 6: Return of a Legend
|
| Lemoore, California, US
|
|
|
|-align=center
|April 25
|UFC 42: Sudden Impact
|
| Miami, Florida, US
|6,700
|35,000
|
|-align=center
|June 6
|UFC 43: Meltdown
|
| Paradise, Nevada, US
|9,800
|49,000
|
|-align=center
|June 8
|Pride 26: Bad to the Bone
|Pride 26: Reborn
| Yokohama, Japan
|
|
|
|-align=center
|August 10
|Pride Total Elimination 2003
|
| Saitama, Japan
|40,316
|
|
|-align=center
|September 26
|UFC 44: Undisputed
|
| Las Vegas, Nevada, US
|10,400
|94,000
|
|-align=center
|October 5
|Pride Bushido 1
|
| Saitama, Japan
|
|
|
|-align=center
|October 10
|Rumble on the Rock 4
|
| Honolulu, Hawaii, US
|
|
|
|-align=center
|November 9
|Pride Final Conflict 2003
|
| Tokyo, Japan
|67,450
|
|
|-align=center
|November 21
|UFC 45: Revolution
|
| Uncasville, Connecticut, US
|9,200
|40,000
|
|-align=center
|December 31
|Pride Shockwave 2003
|
| Saitama, Japan
|39,716
|
|
|-align=center
|December 31
|K-1 PREMIUM 2003 Dynamite!!
|
| Nagoya, Japan
|43,560
|
|
|-align=center

Motorsport

Radiosport
 Fifth High Speed Telegraphy World Championship held in Minsk, Belarus.

Rugby league

2003 NRL grand final - won by the Penrith Panthers.
2003 Kangaroo tour took place in the post season with Australia winning The Ashes
2003 Challenge Cup - won by the Bradford Bulls
2003 World Club Challenge - won by the Sydney Roosters
2003 Super League Grand Final - won by the Bradford Bulls
2003 State of Origin series - won by New South Wales

Rugby union

 109th Six Nations Championship series is won by England who complete the Grand Slam
 Bledisloe Cup – New Zealand All Blacks defeats the Wallabies 2 matches to 0 in a two-match series
 Heineken Cup – Toulouse defeats Perpignan 22–17
 Rugby World Cup – England defeats Australia 20–17 after extra time
 Tri Nations Series – New Zealand

Show jumping
 Marcus Ehning of Germany wins the Show Jumping World Cup riding his Oldenburg mare, Anka

Snooker
 World Snooker Championship – Mark Williams beats Ken Doherty 18-16
 World rankings – Mark Williams becomes world number one for 2003/04

Swimming
 July – 10th World LC Championships held at Barcelona
 August – Swimming at the 2003 Pan American Games, held at Santo Domingo, Dominican Republic
 December – 7th European SC Championships 2003, held at Dublin
 Germany wins the most medals (21); Germany and Great Britain win the most gold medals (7)

Tennis

 Grand Slam in tennis men's results:
 Australian Open – Andre Agassi defeats Rainer Schüttler, 6-2, 6-2, 6-1.
 French Open – Juan Carlos Ferrero defeats Martin Verkerk, 6-1, 6-3, 6-2.
 Wimbledon championships – Roger Federer defeats Mark Philippoussis, 7-6, 6-2, 7-6.
 U.S. Open – Andy Roddick defeats Juan Carlos Ferrero, 6-3, 7-6, 6-3.
 Grand Slam in tennis women's results:
 Australian Open – Serena Williams defeats Venus Williams, 7-6, 3-6, 6-4.
 French Open – Justine Henin-Hardenne defeats Kim Clijsters, 6-0, 6-4.
 Wimbledon championships – Serena Williams defeats Venus Williams, 4-6, 6-4, 6-2.
 U.S. Open – Justine Henin-Hardenne defeats Kim Clijsters, 7-5, 6-1.
 Pete Sampras retires, aged 32 on August 25

Volleyball
 Men's World League: Brazil
 Women's World Grand Prix: China
 2003 FIVB Men's World Cup: Brazil
 2003 FIVB Women's World Cup: China
 2003 Men's European Volleyball Championship: Italy
 2003 Women's European Volleyball Championship: Poland

Water polo
 2003 FINA Men's World Water Polo Championship: Hungary
 2003 FINA Men's Water Polo World League: Hungary
 2003 Men's European Water Polo Championship: Yugoslavia
 2003 FINA Women's World Water Polo Championship: USA
 2003 Women's European Water Polo Championship: Italy

Weightlifting
 World Championships held in Vancouver, British Columbia, Canada

Yacht racing
 Switzerland becomes the first landlocked country to win the America's Cup as Alinghi, from the Société Nautique de Genève, beats defender Team New Zealand, of the Royal New Zealand Yacht Squadron, 5 races to 0

Multi-sport events
 14th Pan American Games held in Santo Domingo, Dominican Republic
 United States tops the medal table with a total number of 270 medals, including 117 golds.
 8th All-Africa Games held in Abuja, Nigeria
 Egypt tops the medal table with a total number of 214 medals, including 80 golds.
 Fifth Winter Asian Games held in Aomori, Japan
 Japan tops the medal table with a total number of 67 medals, including 24 golds.
 First Afro–Asian Games held in Hyderabad, India
 China tops the medal table with a total number of 41 medals, including 25 golds.
 XXII Summer Universiade held in Daegu, South Korea
 China tops the medal table with a total number of 80 medals, including 41 golds.
 21st Winter Universiade held in Tarvisio, Italy
 Russia tops the medal table with a total number of 31 medals, including 11 golds.
 12th South Pacific Games held in Suva, Fiji

Awards
 Associated Press Male Athlete of the Year – Lance Armstrong, Cycling
 Associated Press Female Athlete of the Year – Annika Sörenstam, LPGA golf

References

 
Sports by year